1989 is the fifth studio album by American singer-songwriter Taylor Swift. It was released on October 27, 2014, by Big Machine Records. After music critics questioned her status as a country musician following her pop and electronic-influenced fourth studio album Red (2012), Swift was inspired by 1980s synth-pop to recalibrate her artistry from country to pop music. On 1989, titled after her birth year to signify her symbolic artistic rebirth, Swift enlisted Max Martin as co-executive producer.

The album's synth-pop sound is characterized by heavy synthesizers, programmed drums, and processed backing vocals. The songs, expanding on Swift's songwriting practice taking inspiration from her personal life, express lighthearted perspectives towards failed relationships, departing from her previous hostile attitude. Swift and Big Machine promoted the album extensively through product endorsements, television, radio appearances and social media. They pulled 1989 from free streaming services such as Spotify, prompting an industry discourse on the impact of streaming on music sales.

After the album's release, Swift embarked on the 1989 World Tour, which was the highest-grossing tour of 2015. The album was supported by seven singles, including three US Billboard Hot 100 number ones: "Shake It Off", "Blank Space", and "Bad Blood". Critics generally praised 1989 for its emotion and melodies, but a few were concerned over the synth-pop production, as they felt it eroded Swift's authenticity as a songwriter due to pop music's capitalist nature—a criticism that has been retrospectively described as rockist. Various publications listed 1989 as one of the best albums of the 2010s decade, with Rolling Stone and Consequence ranking it amongst the best of all time.

At the 58th Grammy Awards in 2016, 1989 won Album of the Year and Best Pop Vocal Album, making Swift the first female solo artist to win Album of the Year twice. In the US, 1989 spent 11 weeks atop the Billboard 200 and was certified ninefold platinum the Recording Industry Association of America (RIAA). It also earned multi-platinum certifications in Australia, Canada, and the UK, and has sold over 10 million copies worldwide. Retrospective commentaries regard 1989 as a key success in transforming Swift's image to that of a pop icon, promoting poptimism, but also highlighted how her artistic integrity and public image suffered from increasing media scrutiny.

Background 
Until the release of her fourth studio album Red in October 2012, singer-songwriter Taylor Swift had been known as a country artist. Red incorporates various pop and rock styles, transcending the country sound of her previous releases. The collaborations with renowned Swedish pop producers Max Martin and Shellback—including the top-five singles "We Are Never Ever Getting Back Together" and "I Knew You Were Trouble"—introduced straightforward pop hooks and new genres including electronic and dubstep to Swift's repertoire. Swift and her label, Big Machine, promoted it as a country album; songs from Red impacted country radio and Swift made multiple appearances at country music awards shows. When it ended, the album's associated world tour, running from March 2013 to June 2014, was the all-time highest-grossing country tour. The diverse musical styles sparked a media debate over Swift's status as a country artist, to which she replied in an interview with The Wall Street Journal, "I leave the genre labeling to other people."

Having been known as "America's Sweetheart" due to her wholesome and down-to-earth image, Swift saw her reputation blemished by her history of romantic relationships with a series of high-profile celebrities. Her relationship with English singer Harry Styles during the promotion of Red was a particular subject for tabloid gossip. She disliked the media portraying her as a "serial-dater", feeling it undermined her professional work, and became more reticent to discuss her personal life in public. Most of the album's lyrics were derived from Swift's journal detailing her personal life; she had been known for autobiographical narratives in her songwriting since her debut. A new inspiration this time was her relocation to New York City in March 2014, which gave Swift a sense of freedom to embark on new ideas. Swift also took inspiration from the media scrutiny of her image to write satirical songs about her perceived image.

Recording and production 

Swift began songwriting for her fifth studio album in mid-2013 while touring to support Red. For Reds follow-up, she sought to create a "blatant pop" record, departing from her country/pop experimentation. She believed that "if you chase two rabbits, you lose them both". Greatly inspired by 1980s synth-pop, she viewed the 1980s as an experimental period that embraced "endless possibilities" when artists abandoned the generic "drums-guitar-bass-whatever" song structure and experimented with stripped-down synthesizers, drum pads, and overlapped vocals. She took inspiration from the music of artists from the period, such as Peter Gabriel and Annie Lennox, to make a synth-pop record that would convey her thoughts unburdened by heavy instrumentation.

To ensure a smooth transition to pop, Swift recruited Max Martin and Shellback as major collaborators, in part because of their reputation as the biggest mainstream pop hitmakers at the time. Speaking to the Associated Press in October 2013, Swift described them as "absolute dream collaborators" because they took her ideas in a different direction, which challenged her as a songwriter. Scott Borchetta, president of Swift's then-label Big Machine, was initially skeptical of Swift's decision. He persuaded Swift to record a few country songs without success, and agreed with her that Big Machine would not promote the new album to country radio. Martin and Shellback produced seven of the thirteen tracks on the album's standard edition. Swift credited Martin as co-executive producer because he also recorded and produced her vocals on tracks on which he was uncredited. This solidified Swift's vision of a coherent record rather than a mere "collection of songs".

Another key figure on the album's production team was Jack Antonoff, with whom Swift had worked on the new wave-influenced song "Sweeter than Fiction" for the soundtrack of One Chance (2013). Antonoff co-wrote and co-produced two tracks on the standard edition. The first, "I Wish You Would", stemmed from his experimental sampling of snare drum instrumentation on Fine Young Cannibals' 1988 single "She Drives Me Crazy", one of their mutual favorite songs. Antonoff played his sample to Swift on an iPhone and sent it to her to re-record. The final track is a remix that retains the distinctive snare drums. For "Out of the Woods", Antonoff sent his finished instrumental track to Swift while she was on a plane. She sent him a voice memo containing the lyrics roughly 30 minutes later. The song was the first time Swift composed lyrics for an existing instrumental. Swift and Antonoff produced one more track for the album's deluxe edition, "You Are in Love".

Swift contacted Ryan Tedder, with whom she had always wanted to work, by a smartphone voice memo. He co-wrote and co-produced two songs—"Welcome to New York" and "I Know Places". For "I Know Places", Swift scheduled a meeting with him at the studio after forming a fully developed idea on her own; the recording process the following day finalized it. Tedder spoke of Swift's work ethic and perfectionism with Time: "Ninety-five times out of 100, if I get a track to where we're happy with it, the artist will say, 'That's amazing.' It's very rare to hear, 'Nope, that's not right.' But the artists I've worked with who are the most successful are the ones who'll tell me to my face, 'No, you're wrong,' two or three times in a row. And she did." For "Clean", Swift approached English producer Imogen Heap in London after writing the song's lyrics and melody. Heap helped to complete the track by playing instruments on it; the two finished recording after two takes in one day at Heap's studio. Nathan Chapman, Swift's longtime collaborator, co-produced the track "This Love". The album was mastered by Tom Coyne in two days at Sterling Sound Studio in New York City. Swift finalized the record upon completing the Asian leg of the Red Tour in mid-2014.

Music and lyrics

Overview 
The standard edition of 1989 includes 13 tracks; the deluxe edition includes six additional tracks—three original songs and three voice memos. The album makes heavy use of synthesizers, programmed drums, pulsating basslines, and processed backing vocals. Because Swift aimed to recreate authentic 1980s pop, the album is devoid of contemporary hip hop or R&B crossover elements popular in mainstream music at the time. Although Swift declared her move from country to pop on 1989, several reviewers, including The A.V. Clubs Marah Eakin, argued that Swift had always been more pop-oriented even on her early country songs. The three voice memos on the deluxe edition contain Swift's discussions of the songwriting process and unfinished demos for three songs—"I Know Places", "I Wish You Would", and "Blank Space". Myles McNutt, a professor in communications and arts, described the voice memos as Swift's effort to claim her authority over 1989, defying pop music's "gendered hierarchy" which had seen a dominance of male songwriters and producers.

Although 1989s production  was a dramatic change from that on Swift's country repertoire, her distinctive storytelling ability, nurtured by her country background, remained intact in her songwriting. The songs are primarily about Swift's recurring themes of the emotions and reflections resulting from past romantic relationships. However, 1989 showcased a maturity in Swift's perspectives: Rolling Stone observed that the album was her first not to villainize ex-lovers, but instead expressed "wistful and nostalgic" viewpoints on broken romance. Pitchforks Vrinda Jagota summarized 1989 as a "fully-realized fantasy of self-reliance, confidence, and ensuing pleasure", where Swift had ceased to dramatize failed relationships and learned to celebrate the moment. The album's liner notes, which include a one-sentence hidden message for each of the 13 songs, collectively tell a story of a girl's tangled relationship. Ultimately, she finds that, "She lost him but she found herself and somehow that was everything." Swift explained her shift in attitude to NPR: "In the past, I've written mostly about heartbreak or pain that was caused by someone else and felt by me. On this album, I'm writing about more complex relationships, where the blame is kind of split 50–50 ... even if you find the right situation relationship-wise, it's always going to be a daily struggle to make it work."

Songs 

Swift's feelings when she first moved to New York City inspired the opening track, "Welcome to New York", a synthesizer-laden song finding Swift embracing her newfound freedom. "Blank Space", set over a minimal hip hop-influenced beat, satirizes the media's perception of Swift as a promiscuous woman who dates male celebrities only to gather songwriting material. The production of "Style", a funk-flavored track, was inspired by "funky electronic music" artists such as Daft Punk; its lyrics detail an unhealthy relationship and contain a reference to the American actor James Dean in the refrain. "Out of the Woods" is an indietronica and synth-pop song featuring heavy synthesizers, layered percussions and looping background vocals, resulting in a chaotic sound. Swift said that the song, which was inspired by a relationship that evoked constant anxiety because of its fragility, "best represents" 1989. "All You Had to Do Was Stay" laments a past relationship and originated from Swift's dream of desperately shouting "Stay" to an ex-lover against her will.

The dance-pop track "Shake It Off", sharing a loosely similar sentiment with "Blank Space", sees Swift expressing disinterest in her detractors and their negative remarks on her image. The bubblegum pop song "I Wish You Would", which uses pulsing snare drums and sizzling guitars, finds Swift longing for the return of a past relationship. Swift said that "Bad Blood", a track that incorporates heavy, stomping drums, is about betrayal by an unnamed female peer (alleged to be Katy Perry, with whom Swift was involved in a feud that received widespread media coverage). "Wildest Dreams" speaks of a dangerous affair with an apparently untrustworthy man and incorporates a sultry, dramatic atmosphere accompanied by string instruments. On "How You Get the Girl", a bubblegum pop track featuring guitar strums over a heavy disco-styled beat, Swift hints at her desire to reunite with an ex-lover. "This Love" is a soft rock-flavored electropop ballad; music critic Jon Caramanica opined the song could be mistaken as "a concession to country" because of the production by Swift's longtime co-producer Nathan Chapman.

The penultimate track of the standard edition is "I Know Places", which expresses Swift's desire to preserve an unstable relationship. Swift stated that it serves as a loose sequel to "Out of the Woods". Accompanied by dark, intense drum and bass-influenced beats, the song uses a metaphor of foxes running away from hunters to convey hiding from scrutiny. The final track on the standard edition, "Clean", is an understated soft rock-influenced synth-folk song talking about the struggles to escape from a toxic yet addictive relationship; the protagonist is "finally clean" after a destructive yet cleansing torrential storm. "Wonderland", the first of the three bonus songs on the deluxe edition, alludes to the fantasy book Alice's Adventures in Wonderland to describe a relationship tumbling down a "rabbit hole". The ballad "You Are in Love" finds Swift talking about an ideal relationship from another woman's perspective. Swift was inspired by the relationship of her close friends Antonoff and Lena Dunham. The final song's title, "New Romantics", refers to the cultural movement in the late 1970s and early 1980s. With a strong 1980s synth-pop sound, the song sees Swift reigniting her hopes and energy after the heartbreaks she had endured.

Title and artwork 
Swift named 1989 after her birth year, which corroborates the influence of 1980s synth-pop. She described the title as a symbolic rebirth of her image and artistry, severing ties with the country stylings of her previous albums. As creative director for the album's packaging, Swift included pictures taken with a Polaroid instant camera—a photographic method popular in the 1980s. The cover is a Polaroid portrait of Swift's face cut off at the eyes, which Swift said would bring about a sense of mystery: "I didn't want people to know the emotional DNA of this album. I didn't want them to see a smiling picture on the cover and think this was a happy album, or see a sad-looking facial expression and think, oh, this is another breakup record." She is wearing red lipstick and a sweatshirt embroidered with flying seagulls. Her initials are written with black marker on the bottom left, and the title 1989 on the bottom right.

Each CD copy of 1989 includes a packet, one of five available sets, of 13 random Polaroid pictures, made up from 65 different pictures. The pictures portray Swift in different settings such as backdrops of New York City and recording sessions with the producers. The photos are out-of-focus, off-framed, with a sepia-tinged treatment, and feature the 1989 songs' lyrics written with black marker on the bottom. Polaroid Corporation chief executive Scott Hardy reported that the 1989 Polaroid concept propelled a revival in instant film, especially among the hipster subculture who valued the "nostalgia and retro element of what [their] company stands for". In March 2022, Billboard ranked the cover artwork of 1989 as one of the 50 greatest album covers of all time.

Release and promotion 

Swift marketed 1989 as her first "official pop" album. To bolster sales, Swift and Big Machine implemented an extensive marketing plan. As observed by Maryn Wilkinson, an academic specialized in media studies, Swift adopted a "zany" aspect for her 1989 persona. As Swift had been associated with a hardworking and authentic persona through her country songs, her venture to "artificial, manufactured" pop required intricate maneuvering to retain her sense of authenticity. She used social media extensively to communicate with her fan base; to attract a younger audience, she had  promoted her country songs online previously. Her social media posts showcased her personal life, making fans feel engaged with her authentic self and thus cemented their support while attracting a new fan base besides her already large one. She also promoted the album through product endorsements with Subway, Keds, and Diet Coke. Swift held a live stream via Yahoo! sponsored by ABC News on August 18, where she announced the details of 1989 and released the lead single "Shake It Off", which debuted atop the US Billboard Hot 100. To connect further with her supporters, Swift selected a number of fans based on their engagement on social media and invited them to secret album-listening sessions, called "The 1989 Secret Sessions". The sessions took place at her properties in Los Angeles, New York City, Nashville, Rhode Island, and London throughout September 2014.

The album's standard and deluxe editions were released for download on digital platforms on October 27, 2014. In the US and Canada, the deluxe edition was available exclusively through Target Corporation. The songs "Out of the Woods" and "Welcome to New York" were released through the iTunes Store as promotional singles on October 14 and 20, respectively. 1989 was supported by a string of commercially successful singles, including Billboard Hot 100 number ones "Blank Space" and "Bad Blood" featuring rapper Kendrick Lamar, and top-10 hits "Style" and "Wildest Dreams". Other singles were "Out of the Woods", previously a promotional single, and "New Romantics". The deluxe edition bonus tracks, which had been available exclusively through Target, were released on the iTunes Store in the US in 2015.

On November 3, 2014, Swift removed her entire catalog from Spotify, the largest on-demand streaming service at the time, arguing that their ad-supported free service undermined the platform's premium service, which provides higher royalties for songwriters. She had written an op-ed for The Wall Street Journal in July 2014, expressing her concerns over the decline of the album as an economic entity following the rise of free, on-demand streaming. Big Machine and Swift kept 1989 only on paid subscription-required platforms such as Rhapsody and Beats Music. This move prompted an industry-wide debate on the impact of streaming on declining record sales during the digital era. In June 2015, Swift stated that she would remove 1989 from Apple Music, criticizing the service for not offering royalties to artists during their free three-month trial period. After Apple Music announced that it would pay artists royalties during the free trial period, she agreed to leave 1989 on their service; she then featured in a series of commercials for Apple Music. She re-added her entire catalog on Spotify in June 2017. Swift began rerecording her first six studio albums, including 1989, in November 2020. The decision came after talent manager Scooter Braun acquired the masters of Swift's first six studio albums, which Swift had been trying to buy for years, following her departure from Big Machine in November 2018.

In addition to online promotion, Swift made many appearances on radio and television. She performed at awards shows including the MTV Video Music Awards and the American Music Awards. Her appearances on popular television talk shows included Jimmy Kimmel Live!, The Ellen DeGeneres Show, Late Show with David Letterman and Good Morning America. She was part of the line-up for the iHeartRadio Music Festival, CBS Radio's "We Can Survive" benefit concert, the Victoria's Secret Fashion Show and the Jingle Ball Tour. The album's supporting tour, the 1989 World Tour, ran from May to December 2015. It kicked off in Tokyo, and concluded in Melbourne. Swift invited various special guests on tour with her, including singers and fashion models the media called Swift's "squad" which received media coverage. The 1989 World Tour was the highest-grossing tour of 2015, earning over $250 million at the box office. In North America alone, the tour grossed $181.5 million, setting the record for highest-grossing US tour by a woman. Swift broke this record in 2018 with her Reputation Stadium Tour.

Critical reception 

1989 received generally positive reviews from contemporary critics. Most reviewers highlighted Swift's mature perception of love and heartbreak. The A.V. Clubs Marah Eakin praised her shift from overtly romantic struggles to more positive themes of accepting and celebrating the moment. Neil McCormick of The Daily Telegraph commended the album's "[sharp] observation and emotional engagement" that contrasted with lyrics found in "commercialised pop". Alexis Petridis of The Guardian lauded Swift's artistic control that resulted in a "perfectly attuned" 1980s-styled synth-pop authenticity.

The album's 1980s synth-pop production divided critics. In an enthusiastic review, The New York Times critic Jon Caramanica complimented Swift's avoidance of contemporary hip hop/R&B crossover trends, writing, "Ms. Swift is aiming somewhere even higher, a mode of timelessness that few true pop stars...even bother aspiring to." Writing for Rolling Stone, Rob Sheffield characterized the record as "deeply weird, feverishly emotional, wildly enthusiastic". In a review published by Cuepoint, Robert Christgau applauded her departure from country to experiment with new styles, but felt this shift was not radical. NME reviewer Matthew Horton considered Swift's transition to pop "a success", save for the inclusion of the "soft-rock mush" of "This Love" and "Clean". Shane Kimberlin writing for musicOMH deemed Swift's transition to pop on 1989 "not completely successful", but praised her lyrics for incorporating "enough heart and personality", which he found rare in the mainstream pop scene.

Some rockist critics lamented that Swift's move from country to pop eroded her authenticity as a songwriter, particularly because of pop music's "capitalist nature" as opposed to country music's emphasis on authenticity. Slant Magazines Annie Galvin observed that Swift maintained the clever songwriting that had distinguished her earlier releases, but was disappointed with the new musical style. Entertainment Weeklys Adam Markovitz and Spin Andrew Unterberger were critical of the heavy synthesizers, which undermined Swift's conventionally vivid lyrics. AllMusic's Stephen Thomas Erlewine described the album as "a sparkling soundtrack to an aspirational lifestyle" that fails to transcend the "transient transparencies of modern pop". Mikael Wood, in his review for the Los Angeles Times, found the album inauthentic, but acknowledged her effort to emulate the music of an era she did not experience.

Accolades 
1989 won Favorite Pop/Rock Album at the 2015 American Music Awards, Album of the Year (Western) at the 2015 Japan Gold Disc Awards, and Album of the Year at the 2016 iHeartRadio Music Awards. It also earned nominations for Best International Pop/Rock Album at the 2015 Echo Music Prize, International Album of the Year at the 2015 Juno Awards, and Best International Album at the Los Premios 40 Principales 2015. At the 58th Grammy Awards in 2016, the album won Album of the Year and Best Pop Vocal Album. Swift became the first female solo artist to win Album of the Year twice—her first win was for Fearless (2008) in 2010.

The album appeared on multiple publications' year-end lists of 2014, ranking at number one on the list by Billboard. Publications ranking it in their 2014 year-end lists included American Songwriter (4th), Time (4th), The Daily Telegraph (5th), The Music (5th), Drowned in Sound (6th), Complex (8th), Rolling Stone (10th), The Guardian (12th), The A.V. Club (15th), PopMatters (15th), Pitchfork (31st), and musicOMH (32nd). The album ranked 7th on The Village Voice 2014 Pazz & Jop critics' poll. In individual critics' lists, 1989 was ranked by Jon Caramanica for The New York Times (7th), Ken Tucker for NPR (3rd), and Brian Mansfield for USA Today (1st).

Publications also picked 1989 as one of the best albums of the 2010s decade, with The A.V. Club and Slant Magazine placing it in the top ten of their lists. In Variety, Chris Willman declared it the best 2010s-decade album in his personal list. According to Metacritic, it was the sixteenth most prominently acclaimed album on the decade-end lists. The Guardian featured the album at number 89 on a 2019 list of the 100 best albums of the 21st century. In terms of audience reception, 1989 ranked at number 44 on Pitchforks readers' poll for the 2010s decade. 1989 placed at number 393 on Rolling Stone 2020 revision of their 500 Greatest Albums of All Time, and number 39 on Consequence The 100 Greatest Albums of All Time.

Commercial performance 
1989 was released amidst a decline in record sales brought about by the emergence of digital download and streaming platforms. Swift's two previous studio albums, Speak Now (2010) and Red (2012), each sold over one million copies within one week, establishing her as one of the best-selling album artists in the digital era. Given the music industry's climate, and Swift's decision to eschew her characteristic country roots that had cultivated a sizable fan base, the sales performance of 1989 was subject to considerable speculation among industry experts. One week before its release, Rolling Stone reported that US retailers predicted the album would sell from 600,000 to 750,000 copies in its debut week.

1989 debuted atop the US Billboard 200 with first-week sales of 1.287 million copies, according to data compiled by Nielsen SoundScan for the chart dated November 15, 2014. Swift became the first artist to have three albums each sell one million copies within the first week, and 1989 was the first album released in 2014 to exceed one million copies. 1989 topped the Billboard 200 for 11 non-consecutive weeks and spent the first full year after its release in the top 10 of the Billboard 200. By September 2020, the album had spent 300 weeks on the chart. 1989 exceeded sales of five million copies in US sales by July 2015, the fastest-selling album since 2004 up to that point. With 6.215 million copies sold by the end of 2019, the album was the third-best-selling album of the 2010s decade in the US. The Recording Industry Association of America (RIAA) certified the album 9× Platinum, which denotes nine million album-equivalent units. All of its singles except "New Romantics" achieved platinum or multi-platinum certifications. The album tracks "Welcome to New York" and "This Love" were certified platinum, and "New Romantics", "All You Had to Do Was Stay", "How You Get the Girl", and "I Know Places" were certified gold.

The album reached number one on the record charts of various European and Oceanic countries, including Australia, Belgium, Ireland, the Netherlands, New Zealand, Norway, and Switzerland. In Canada, it was certified 6× Platinum and was the fifth-best-selling album of the 2010s, with sales of 542,000 copies. It was the fastest-selling album by a female artist of 2014 in the UK, where it earned a five-times platinum certification from the British Phonographic Industry. 1989 also achieved success in Asia. It became one of the best-selling digital albums in China, having sold one million units as of August 2019. It also received a platinum certification in Japan. According to the International Federation of the Phonographic Industry (IFPI), 1989 was the second-best-selling album of 2014 and third-best-selling of 2015. By 2017, the album had sold 10 million copies worldwide.

Legacy 
1989s commercial success transformed Swift's image from a country singer to that of a pop icon. It was the second album to spawn five or more US top-10 singles in the 2010s decade, and made Swift the second woman to have two albums each score five US top-10 hits. Its singles received heavy rotation on US radio over a year and a half following its release, which Billboard noted as "a kind of cultural omnipresence" that was rare for a 2010s album. The academic Shaun Cullen specializing in the humanities described Swift as a figure "at the cutting edge of postmillennial pop". 1989 electronic-pop production expanded on Swift's next two studio albums, Reputation (2017) and Lover (2019).

American rock singer-songwriter Ryan Adams released his track-by-track cover album of 1989 in September 2015. Finding it a "joyful" record, he listened to the album frequently to cope with his broken marriage in late 2014. On his rendition, Adams incorporated acoustic instruments which contrast with the original's electronic production. Swift was delighted with Adams' cover, saying to him, "What you did with my album was like actors changing emphasis." Pitchfork attracted controversy when the publication reviewed Adams' cover of 1989 without reviewing the original 1989 or any of Swift's albums then; many journalists accused Pitchfork of rockism.

Along with 1989 success, Swift's status as a pop star became a subject of media scrutiny. Swift described herself as a feminist, but her public appearances with singers and fashion models whom the media called her "squad" gave the impression that she did so just to keep her name afloat in news headlines. Kristy Fairclough, a professor in popular culture and film, commented, "Her shifting aesthetic and allegiances appear confusing in an overall narrative that presents Taylor Swift as the centre of the cultural universe." Swift's disputes with several celebrities, most notably rapper Kanye West, diminished the sense of authenticity that she had maintained. Swift announced a prolonged hiatus following the 1989 World Tour because "people might need a break from [her]". Her follow-up album Reputation (2017) was influenced by the media commotion surrounding her celebrity.

Retrospective comments from GQ Jay Willis, Vulture Sasha Geffen, and NME Hannah Mylrea praised how 1989 avoided contemporary hip hop and R&B crossover trends, making it a timeless album that represents the best of Swift's prowess. Mylrea praised it as the singer's best record and described it as an influence for younger musicians to embrace "pure pop", contributing to a growing trend of nostalgic 1980s-styled sound. Geffen also attributed the album's success to its lyrics offering emotional engagement that is uncommon in pop. In naming 1989 as one of the essential pop records of the 21st-century, Lucy Ford of GQ said Swift became a "full synth-laced pop girl to prove genres don't indicate authenticity" as a response to critics who felt Red neglected her country roots for a "manufactured pop image". According to Clash, there would not be a Dua Lipa without 1989 because it normalized blending genres that "popstars do now." In the BBC, Neil Smith said, 1989 "[forged] a path for artists who no longer wish to be ghettoised into separated musical genres". Ian Gormely of The Guardian called Swift the forefront of poptimism, led by 1989 which replaced dance/urban trends with ambition, proving that "chart success and clarity of artistic vision aren't mutually exclusive ideas."

Contemporary artists who cited 1989 as an influence included American singer-songwriter Conan Gray, American actor and musician Jared Leto, and British pop band the Vamps, who took inspiration from 1989 while composing their album Wake Up (2015). American director Jennifer Kaytin Robinson cited 1989 as an inspiration for her feature film debut, Someone Great (2019).

Track listing

Notes 
  signifies a vocal producer
  signifies an additional producer

Personnel 
Credits are adapted from the liner notes of 1989.

Production

 Taylor Swift – writer, producer, executive producer, creative director
 Max Martin – vocal production, producer, writer, programming, executive producer
 Shellback – producer, writer, programming
 Imogen Heap – producer, writer, recording programming
 Jack Antonoff – writer, producer
 Ryan Tedder – producer, recording, writer, additional programming
 Ali Payami – writer, producer, programming
 Noel Zancanella – producer, additional programming
 Nathan Chapman – producer, recording
 Jason Campbell – production coordinator
 Mattman & Robin – producer, programming
 Greg Kurstin – additional production
 Michael Ilbert – recording

 Smith Carlson – recording
 Laura Sisk – recording
 Sam Holland – recording
 Matthew Tryba – assistant recording
 Eric Eylands – assistant recording
 Brendan Morawski – assistant recording
 Cory Bice – assistant recording
 Şerban Ghenea – mixing
 John Hanes – engineered for mix
 Peter Carlsson – Pro Tools engineer
 Tom Coyne – mastering
 Sarah Barlow – photography
 Stephen Schofield – photography
 Josh & Bethany Newman – art direction
 Austin Hale and Amy Fucci – design
 Joseph Cassell – wardrobe stylist

Instruments

 Taylor Swift – heartbeat, claps, shouts, acoustic guitar, lead vocals, background vocals
 Max Martin – keyboard, piano, claps, shouts, background vocals
 Shellback – acoustic guitar, electric guitar, bass, keyboard, percussion, shouts, stomps, additional guitars, guitar, knees, noise, claps, drums, background vocals
 Imogen Heap – vibraphone, drums, mbira, percussion, keyboards, background vocals
 Jack Antonoff – acoustic guitar, electric guitar, keyboards, bass, drums, background vocals
 Ryan Tedder – piano, juno, acoustic guitar, electric guitar, drum programming, additional synth, background vocals

 Niklas Ljungfelt – guitar
 Jonas Thander – saxophone
 Jonas Lindeborg – trumpet
 Magnus Wiklund – trombone
 Ali Payami – keyboards
 Noel Zancanella – drum programming, synthesizer, bass, additional synth
 Nathan Chapman – electric guitar, bass, keyboards, drums
 Mattman & Robin – drums, guitar, bass, keyboard, percussion
 Greg Kurstin – keyboards

Charts

Weekly charts

Year-end charts

Decade-end charts

All-time charts

Certifications and sales

Release history

See also 
 List of Billboard 200 number-one albums of 2014
 List of Billboard 200 number-one albums of 2015
 List of UK Albums Chart number ones of the 2010s
 List of UK Album Downloads Chart number ones of the 2010s
 List of best-selling albums by year in the United States
 List of best-selling albums in China
 List of best-selling albums in the United States of the Nielsen SoundScan era
 List of best-selling albums of the 2010s in the United Kingdom
 List of best-selling albums of the 21st century
 List of best-selling albums by women
 Lists of fastest-selling albums
 List of albums which have spent the most weeks on the UK Albums Chart

Notes

Citations

Bibliography

External links 

 

2014 albums
Taylor Swift albums
Albums produced by Taylor Swift
Albums produced by Jack Antonoff
Albums produced by Max Martin
Albums produced by Shellback (record producer)
Albums produced by Ryan Tedder
Albums produced by Nathan Chapman (record producer)
Albums produced by Mattman & Robin
Big Machine Records albums
Grammy Award for Album of the Year
Grammy Award for Best Pop Vocal Album
Synth-pop albums by American artists
Albums produced by Ali Payami
Albums produced by Imogen Heap